Petr Rybička (born 14 January 1996) is a Czech football player who currently plays for Czech First League side FC Hradec Králové.

Honours
 MFK Chrudim
 ČFL top-goalscorer: 2015-2016

References

External links
 Profile at FC Zbrojovka Brno official site
 
 Profile at Livesport.cz

1996 births
Living people
Czech footballers
Association football forwards
Czech First League players
Czech National Football League players
FC Zbrojovka Brno players
MFK Chrudim players
1. SC Znojmo players
FK Pardubice players
People from Chrudim
Sportspeople from the Pardubice Region
FC Hradec Králové players
Czech Republic youth international footballers